Kallin is a surname. Notable people with this surname include:

Anna Kristina Kallin (1953–2004), Swedish singer and actor
Catherine Kallin, Canadian physicist
Cecilia Kallin (born 1991), Swedish pop musician
Eva Kallin, American mathematician
Patrik Kallin (born 1979), Swedish wheelchair curler